Sanford C. Sigoloff (September 8, 1930 – February 19, 2011) was an American businessman and philanthropist. He became known as "Mr. Chapter 11" for his rescuing of a number of companies from bankruptcy, in the course of which he pioneered an investor-friendly "slash-and-burn strategy" at the expense of employees. He supported charitable causes and the UCLA Anderson School of Management, where is the namesake of an endowed chair.

Early life
Sanford C. Sigoloff was born on September 8, 1930 in St. Louis, Missouri. His father served as a physician in the United States Army during World War II.

Sigoloff was educated at the Beverly Hills High School in Beverly Hills, California. He graduated from the University of California, Los Angeles (UCLA), where he earned a bachelor of science in physics and biology in 1951.

Career
Sigoloff began his career by working for the United States Atomic Energy Commission. During the Korean War, he worked as a researcher for the United States Air Force. From 1963 to 1969, he worked for the Electro-Optical Systems, later known as Xerox, in Pasadena, California.

Sigoloff rescued Republic Corp. and Daylin Inc. from bankruptcy in the 1970s. In the course of his restructuring of Daylin, he fired many employees, including Arthur Blank and Bernard Marcus, who went on to found The Home Depot.

In 1985, Sigoloff took over as the chief executive of the Wickes Corporation, the parent company of retailers Builder's Emporium, Wickes Furniture, Red Owl Supermarkets and Snyder Drug Stores, when the company was facing bankruptcy. In this capacity, he appeared in commercials on national television, as a spokesman for Wickes' Builders Emporium. He also led the $1 billion acquisition of Gulf and Western Industries. Once again, Sigoloff rescued the company.

However, when Sigoloff tried to rescue LJ Hooker, it proved impossible. Nevertheless, Sigoloff became known as "Mr. Chapter 11."

Philanthropy
Sigoloff made charitable contributions to the Cedars-Sinai Medical Center, the City of Hope National Medical Center, the Center Theatre Group, the American Jewish Committee, and the United States Holocaust Memorial Museum.

Sigoloff served on the board of visitors of the UCLA Anderson School of Management from 1984 to 2002. He is the namesake of the Sanford and Betty Sigoloff Chair in Corporate Renewal, held by Professor William G. Ouchi.

Personal life and death
Sigoloff married his wife, Betty, in 1952. They had two sons, John and Stephen, and a daughter, Laurie. They resided in Brentwood, Los Angeles. He collected Porsches.

Sigoloff died of pneumonia on February 19, 2011. He had suffered from Alzheimer's disease. His funeral was held at the Wilshire Boulevard Temple.

On his death, Professor Edward Altman of the New York University Stern School of Business said Sigoloff "was considered one of the pioneers of the slash-and-burn strategy that resonated with creditors," but he added that "it was controversial because people felt that there was too much carnage in terms of quick dismissals."

References

1930 births
2011 deaths
People from St. Louis
People from Brentwood, Los Angeles
Beverly Hills High School alumni
University of California, Los Angeles alumni
Businesspeople from Los Angeles
American chief executives
Philanthropists from California
American car collectors
Deaths from pneumonia in California
People with Alzheimer's disease
20th-century American businesspeople
20th-century American philanthropists